Lavinia Chrystal (born 5 March 1989 in Camperdown, Australia) is an alpine skier from Australia. She competed for Australia at the 2014 Winter Olympics in the alpine skiing events. Chrystal attended Ascham School.

References

1989 births
Australian female alpine skiers
Alpine skiers at the 2014 Winter Olympics
Olympic alpine skiers of Australia
People educated at Ascham School
Sportswomen from New South Wales
Living people